Todd Edward Pillion (born November 1, 1973) is an American dentist, business owner, and politician from the Commonwealth of Virginia. A member of the Republican Party, Pillion represents the 40th district in the Virginia Senate in Southwest Virginia. He previously represented the 4th district in the Virginia House of Delegates.

Pillion is from Abingdon, Virginia.

Education and military career
Pillion graduated from Thomas Walker High School in Ewing, Virginia, and then from Lincoln Memorial University in Harrogate, Tennessee. Finally, Pillion graduated from the Virginia Commonwealth University School of Dentistry. He joined the Virginia Army National Guard, with the commission of captain. He served with the 42nd Infantry Division in Operation Iraqi Freedom, operating in Tikrit. He was promoted to major by 2009, when he left the Virginia Army National Guard after eight years of service.

Political career
In December 2014, Pillion won a special election to the House of Delegates to fill the seat of Ben Chafin, a Republican who was elected to the Virginia State Senate.

In 2019, Pillion was elected to the open 40th district of the Virginia Senate, defeating independent Ken Heath.

References

External links

Todd Pillion at the Virginia Public Access Project

Living people
Politicians from Abingdon, Virginia
National Guard (United States) officers
American dentists
Republican Party members of the Virginia House of Delegates
Republican Party Virginia state senators
21st-century American politicians
1973 births
Lincoln Memorial University alumni
Virginia Commonwealth University alumni